The 2014 Women's EuroHockey Junior Championship was the 17th edition of the Women's EuroHockey Junior Championship, a field hockey tournament. It was held in Waterloo, Belgium between 20 and 26 July 2014.

The tournament served as a qualifier for the 2016 Women's Hockey Junior World Cup, held in Santiago, Chile in November and December 2016.

Netherlands won the tournament by defeating Germany 2–0 in the final. England won the bronze medal by defeating Spain 2–0 in the third-place playoff.

Participating nations
Alongside the host nation, 7 teams competed in the tournament.

Results

Preliminary round

Pool A

Pool B

Classification round

Pool C

First to fourth place classification

Semi-finals

Third and fourth place

Final

Statistics

Final standings

See also
2014 Men's EuroHockey Junior Championship

References

Women's EuroHockey Junior Championship
Junior
EuroHockey Junior Championship 
field hockey
International women's field hockey competitions hosted by Belgium 
EuroHockey Junior Championship
EuroHockey Championship
Waterloo, Belgium
Sport in Walloon Brabant
EuroHockey Junior Championship